The 1993 Missouri Tigers football team represented the University of Missouri during the 1993 NCAA Division I-A football season. They played their home games at Faurot Field in Columbia, Missouri.  They were members of the Big 8 Conference. The team was coached by fifth–year head coach Bob Stull, who was fired following the conclusion of the season.

Schedule

Coaching staff

References

Missouri
Missouri Tigers football seasons
Missouri Tigers football